"Granted" is a song by American singer Josh Groban, It was released in early June 2018 along with a lyric video as the lead single on his album Bridges.

Charts

Weekly charts

Year-end charts

References

2018 songs
Josh Groban songs
Reprise Records singles
Songs written by Josh Groban
Songs written by Toby Gad
Songs written by Bernie Herms